James Carruthers (1759–1832) was a Scottish Roman Catholic priest and historian.

Life
He was the son of Catholic parents, Andrew Carruthers and his wife Lucy Rigg; Bishop Andrew Carruthers was his brother. He was born in New Abbey in the Stewartry of Kirkcudbright.

Fr. Carruthers was educated in the Scottish College, Douai, and on his return to Scotland was ordained priest and appointed to the charge of Glenlivet. Afterwards he was successively at Buchan, in Aberdeenshire, at Preshome in the Enzie, at Dumfries, and at St Mary's,  New Abbey, where he died on 14 February 1832. He was buried in the graveyard of Sweetheart Abbey.

Works
Carruthers wrote:

 The History of Scotland from the earliest period of the Scottish Monarchy to the Accession of the Stewart Family, interspersed with Synoptical Reviews of Politics, Literature, and Religion throughout the World, 2 vols., Edinburgh, 1826.
 The History of Scotland during the reign of Queen Mary until the accession of her son James to the crown of England, Edinburgh, 1831.

See also
Catholic Church in Scotland

Notes

 
Attribution
 

 

1759 births
1832 deaths
Scottish Roman Catholic priests
19th-century Scottish historians
People from Dumfries and Galloway